The Samantha Kshatriya are a community of Kerala, India. They were historically ruling elites and feudal land owners in the Kingdom of Cochin and Kingdom of Travancore.  Despite their nomenclature suggesting that they are a part of the Kshatriya class in the Hindu ritual ranking system known as varna, that system has never existed in South India. Anthropologist Christopher Fuller, suggests such claims are vanity and that "most unbiased observers ... have concluded that the Kshatriya and Samanthan subdivisions should be treated merely as supereminent Nayar subdivisions". The notable exception to that scholarly consensus is the sociologist Louis Dumont.

References

Social groups of Kerala